Carl August Fleischer (born 26 August 1936) is a Norwegian jurist, born in Oslo. He was  professor of jurisprudence at the University of Oslo from 1970. He has been a long-term consultant for the Ministry of Foreign Affairs, and participated in a number of public committees.

References

1936 births
Living people
Academic staff of the Faculty of Law, University of Oslo